Fire and the Night is an American novel by Philip José Farmer. It was published in 1962 by Regency Books, as a paperback costing 50 cents. Unusual for Farmer, the novel contains no science fictional or otherwise fantastic themes. It was his first "mainstream" book, but did not attract much attention from critics or readers alike.  It has been recently reprinted by Subterranean Press in the collection The Other in the Mirror.

Fire and the Night tells the story of a Caucasian man and an African-American woman who work at a contemporary steel mill. The man becomes attracted to the woman, who is married, and the book follows their struggle to understand their feelings.

References
Fire and the Night at Farmer's official website.
Publishing history of Fire and the Night

1962 American novels
American romance novels
Novels by Philip José Farmer